In dentistry, maximum intercuspation refers to the occlusal position of the mandible in which the cusps of the teeth of both arches fully interpose themselves with the cusps of the teeth of the opposing arch.  This position used to be referred to as centric occlusion.

This is an important jaw position, as it defines both the anterior-posterior and lateral relationships of the mandible and the maxilla, as well as the superior-inferior relationship known as the vertical dimension of occlusion.  These are important considerations when evaluating a patient orthodontically, as well as restoring them prosthodontically.

See also
 Occlusion (dentistry)

References

 Ash, Major M.; Nelson, Stanley. WHEELER'S DENTAL ANATOMY, PHYSIOLOGY AND OCCLUSION, 8th edition.

Dental anatomy